Nijenhuis is a Dutch toponymic surname. It is a form of Nieuwenhuis ("new house") found most commonly in the provinces of Gelderland and Overijssel.

Geographical distribution
As of 2014, 90.9% of all known bearers of the surname Nijenhuis were residents of the Netherlands (frequency 1:3,093), 3.4% of Australia (1:116,539), 1.2% of Brazil (1:2,763,678), 1.1% of Germany (1:1,234,287) and 1.0% of Canada (1:623,695).

In the Netherlands, the frequency of the surname was higher than national average (1:3,093) in the following provinces:
 1. Overijssel (1:793)
 2. Gelderland (1:1,203)
 3. Drenthe (1:2,270)
 4. Friesland (1:2,623)
 5. Flevoland (1:2,719)
 6. Groningen (1:2,857)

People
Albert Nijenhuis (1926–2015), Dutch and American mathematician. Named after him:
The mathematical operators Frölicher–Nijenhuis bracket, Nijenhuis–Richardson bracket, and Schouten–Nijenhuis bracket
 (born 1972), Dutch historian 
 (1798–1868), Dutch diplomat, Minister of Foreign affairs in 1848
Beorn Nijenhuis (born 1984), Canadian-born Dutch speed skater
Emmie te Nijenhuis (born 1931), Dutch ethnomusicologist
Jan te Nijenhuis (born 1964), Dutch psychologist and psychometrician
Johan Nijenhuis (born 1968), Dutch film director and producer
Wiebe Nijenhuis (1955–2016), Dutch weightlifter

See also
Nienhuis, Nijhuis, different forms of the same surname

References

Dutch-language surnames
Toponymic surnames